Ribemont-sur-Ancre is a commune in the Somme département in Hauts-de-France in northern France.

Geography

Population

See also
Communes of the Somme department

References

External links

 Website of the Centre archéologique départemental de Ribemont-sur-Ancre 
 Culture.gouv 
 South Africans buried in Ribemont Communal Cemetery Extension

Communes of Somme (department)
Ambiani